Argyractis is a genus of moths of the family Crambidae.

Species
Argyractis argentilinealis Hampson, 1897
Argyractis berthalis (Schaus, 1906) 
Argyractis coloralis (Guenée, 1854)  
Argyractis dodalis  Schaus, 1924
Argyractis drumalis (Dyar, 1906)
Argyractis elphegalis (Schaus, 1924)
Argyractis flavalis (Warren, 1889)
Argyractis iasusalis (Walker, 1859)
Argyractis lophosomalis Hampson, 1906
Argyractis obliquifascia (Hampson, 1917)
Argyractis parthenodalis Hampson, 1906
Argyractis subornata (Hampson, 1897)
Argyractis tapajosalis Schaus, 1924

Former species
Argyractis albipunctalis (Hampson, 1897)
Argyractis argyrolepta (Dyar, 1914)
Argyractis cancellalis (Dyar, 1917)
Argyractis constellalis (Hampson, 1897)
Argyractis fulvicinctalis (Hampson, 1897)
Argyractis glycysalis (Dyar, 1914)
Argyractis lanceolalis (Hampson, 1897)
Argyractis leucostola Hampson, 1917
Argyractis leucostrialis Hampson, 1906
Argyractis multipicta (Dyar, 1914)
Argyractis nandinalis Hampson, 1906
Argyractis nigerialis Hampson, 1906
Argyractis niphoplagialis Hampson, 1897
Argyractis nymphulalis Hampson, 1906
Argyractis pentopalis Hampson, 1906
Argyractis pavonialis (Hampson, 1897)
Argyractis pervenustalis (Hampson, 1897)
Argyractis supercilialis (Hampson, 1897)
Argyractis ticonalis Dyar, 1914

References

 , 1906: The North American Nymphulinae and Scopariinae. Journal of the New York Entomological Society 14 (2): 77–107.
 , 1917: Notes on North American Nymphulinae (Lepidoptera, Pyralidae). Insecutor Inscitiae Menstruus, 5 (4–6): 75–79.
 , 1897: On the classification of two subfamilies of moths of the family Pyralidae: The Hydrocampinae and Scoparianae. Transactions of the Entomological Society of London: 127–240.
 , 1906: Descriptions of new Pyralidae of the subfamilies Hydrocampinae and Scopariinae . Annals and Magazine of Natural History, including Zoology, Botany and Geology, (ser. 7) 18: 373–393, 455–472.
 , 1917: Descriptions of new Pyralidae of the subfamilies Hydrocampinae, Scoparianae, & c. Annals and Magazine of Natural History, including Zoology, Botany and Geology, (ser. 8) 19: 361–376, 457–473.
 , 1906: Descriptions of new South American moths. Proceedings of the United States National Museum, 30: 85-141.
 , 1924: New species of Pyralidae of the subfamily Nymphulinae from tropical America (Lepid.). Proceedings of the Entomological Society of Washington 26 (5): 93-130.
 , 1859: Pyralides. List of the Specimens of Lepidopterous Insects in the Collection of the British Museum, 19: 799–1036.
 , 1889: On the Pyralidina collected in 1874 and 1875 by Dr. J. W. H. Trail in the basin of the Amazons. Transactions of the Entomological Society of London 1889': 227–295.

Acentropinae
Crambidae genera
Taxa named by George Hampson